A Twenty20 International (T20I) is a form of cricket, played between two of the international members of the International Cricket Council (ICC), in which each team faces a maximum of twenty overs. The matches have top-class status and are the highest T20 standard. The game is played under the rules of Twenty20 cricket. The first Twenty20 International match between two men's sides was played on 17 February 2005, involving Australia and New Zealand. Wisden Cricketers' Almanack reported that "neither side took the game especially seriously", and it was noted by ESPNcricinfo that but for a large score for Ricky Ponting, "the concept would have shuddered". However, Ponting himself said "if it does become an international game then I'm sure the novelty won't be there all the time".
This is a list of Australia Cricket team's Twenty20 International records. It is based on the List of Twenty20 International records, but concentrates solely on records dealing with the Australian cricket team. Australia played the first ever T20I in 2005.

Key
The top five records are listed for each category, except for the team wins, losses, draws and ties, all round records and the partnership records. Tied records for fifth place are also included. Explanations of the general symbols and cricketing terms used in the list are given below. Specific details are provided in each category where appropriate. All records include matches played for Australia only, and are correct .

Team records

Overall Record

Team wins, losses, draws and ties 
, Australia has played 174 T20I matches resulting in 94 victories, 76 defeats, 3 ties and 4 no results for an overall winning percentage of 54.41.

First bilateral T20I series wins

First T20I match wins

Team scoring records

Most runs in an innings
The highest innings total scored in T20Is has been scored twice. The first occasion came in the match between Afghanistan and Ireland when Afghanistan scored 278/3 in the 2nd T20I of the Ireland series in India in February 2019. The Czech Republic national cricket team against Turkey during the 2019 Continental Cup scored 278/4 to equal the record. The highest score for Australia is 263/3 scored against Sri Lanka during the 2016 tour of Sri Lanka.

Fewest runs in an innings
The lowest innings total scored was by Turkey against Czech Republic when they were dismissed for 21 during the 2019 Continental Cup. The lowest score in T20I history for Australia is 62 scored against Bangladesh in the 2021 tour of Bangladesh.

Most runs conceded an innings
The fifth match of the 2017–18 Trans-Tasman Tri-Series against New Zealand saw Australia concede their highest innings total of 243/6.

Fewest runs conceded in an innings
The lowest score conceded by Australia for a full inning is 73 when they dismissed IBangladeshduring the 2021 ICC Men's T20 World Cup at Dubai Sports City.

Most runs aggregate in a match
The highest match aggregate scored in T20Is came in the match between India and West Indies in the first T20I of the August 2016 series at Central Broward Regional Park, Lauderhill when India scored 244/4 in response to West Indies score of 245/6 to lose the match by 1 run. The fifth match of the 2017–18 Trans-Tasman Tri-Series against New Zealand saw ä total of 488 runs being scored, the most involving Australia.

Fewest runs aggregate in a match
The lowest match aggregate in T20Is is 57 when Turkey were dismissed for 28 by Luxembourg in the second T20I of the 2019 Continental Cup in Romania in August 2019. The lowest match aggregate in T20I history for Australia is 149 scored during the only T20I of India's tour of Australia in February 2008.

Result records
A T20I match is won when one side has scored more runs than the runs scored by the opposing side during their innings. If both sides have completed both their allocated innings and the side that fielded last has the higher aggregate of runs, it is known as a win by runs. This indicates the number of runs that they had scored more than the opposing side. If the side batting last wins the match, it is known as a win by wickets, indicating the number of wickets that were still to fall.

Greatest win margins (by runs)
The greatest winning margin by runs in T20Is was Czech Republic's victory over Turkey by 257 runs in the sixth match of the 2019 Continental Cup. The largest victory recorded by Australia was during the Australia's tour of Sri Lanka in 2016 by 134 runs.

Greatest win margins (by balls remaining)
The greatest winning margin by balls remaining in T20Is was Austria's victory over Turkey by 104 balls remaining in the ninth match of the 2019 Continental Cup. The largest victory recorded by Australia is during the 2007 ICC World Twenty20 against Sri Lanka when they won by 10 wickets with 58 balls remaining.

Greatest win margins (by wickets)
A total of 32 matches have ended with chasing team winning by 10 wickets with New Zealand winning by such margins a record three times. Australia have won a T20I match by this margin on three occasions.

Highest successful run chases
Australia holds the record for the highest successful run chase which they achieved when they scored 245/5 in response to New Zealand's 243/6.

Narrowest win margins (by runs)
The narrowest run margin victory is by 1 run which has been achieved in 15 T20I's with Australia winning such games once.

Narrowest win margins (by balls remaining)
The narrowest winning margin by balls remaining in T20Is is by winning of the last ball which has been achieved 26 times. Australia has achieve victory of the last ball on two occasions.

Narrowest win margins (by wickets)
The narrowest margin of victory by wickets is 1 wicket which has settled four such T20Is. The narrowest victory by wickets for Australia is two wickets.

Greatest loss margins (by runs)
Australia's biggest defeat by runs was against England in the 2005 only T20I at Rose Bowl, Southampton, England.

Greatest loss margins (by balls remaining)
The largest defeat suffered by Australia was against England in UAE during the 2021 ICC Men's T20 World Cup when they lost by 8 wickets with 50 balls remaining.

Greatest loss margins (by wickets)
Australia have lost a T20I match by a margin of 9 wickets on one occasion.

Narrowest loss margins (by runs)
The narrowest loss of Australia in terms of runs is by 2 runs suffered twice.

Narrowest loss margins (by balls remaining)
Australia has suffered loss off the last ball four times.

Narrowest loss margins (by wickets)
Australia has suffered defeat by 1 wicket once.

Tied matches 
A tie can occur when the scores of both teams are equal at the conclusion of play, provided that the side batting last has completed their innings. 
There have been 19 ties in T20Is history with Australia involved in three such game.

Individual records

Batting records

Most career runs
A run is the basic means of scoring in cricket.
New Zealand's Martin Guptill has scored the most runs in T20Is with 3,299. Second is Virat Kohli from India with 3,296 ahead of Rohit Sharma of India in third. Aaron Finch is the leading Australian batsmen on this list.

Most runs in each batting position

Highest individual score
The third T20I of the 2018 Zimbabwe Tri-Nation Series saw Aaron Finch score the highest Individual score.

Highest individual score – progression of record

Highest score against each opponent

Highest career average
A batsman's batting average is the total number of runs they have scored divided by the number of times they have been dismissed.

Highest Average in each batting position

Most half-centuries
A half-century is a score of between 50 and 99 runs. Statistically, once a batsman's score reaches 100, it is no longer considered a half-century but a century.

Virat Kohli of India has scored most half-centuries in T20Is i.e. 28 fifties. David Warner has scored most 50s for Aussies.

Most centuries
A century is a score of 100 or more runs in a single inning.

Rohit Sharma has scored the most centuries in T20Is with 4. Glenn Maxwell, with three such knocks, holds the Australian record.

Most Sixes

Most Fours

Highest strike rates
Ramesh Satheesan of Romania holds the record for highest strike rate, with minimum 250 balls faced qualification, with 188.35. Maxwell is the Australian with the highest strike rate.

Highest strike rates in an innings
Dwayne Smith of West Indies strike rate of 414.28 during his 29 off 7 balls against Bangladesh during 2007 ICC World Twenty20 is the world record for highest strike rate in an innings. Marcus Stoinis with his innings of 59* off 18 balls against Sri Lanka in October 2022 during the 2022 ICC Men's T20 World Cup holds the top position for an Australia player in this list.

Most runs in a calendar year
Mohammad Rizwan of Pakistan holds the record for most runs scored in a calendar year with 1033 runs scored in 2021. Mitchell Marsh scored 550 runs in 2021, the most for an Australian batsmen in a year.

Most runs in a series
The 2014 ICC World Twenty20 in Bangladesh saw Virat Kohli set the record for the most runs scored in a single series scoring 319 runs. He is followed by Tillakaratne Dilshan with 317 runs scored in the 2009 ICC World Twenty20. Aaron Finch has scored the most runs in a series for an Australia batsmen, when he scored 306 runs in the 2018 Zimbabwe Tri-Nation Series.

Most ducks
A duck refers to a batsman being dismissed without scoring a run. 
Ireland's Kevin O'Brien has the most number of ducks in T20Is with 12 such knocks followed by Tillakaratne Dilshan of Sri Lanka, Soumya Sarkar of Bangladesh and Pakistan's Umar Akmal with 10 such knocks. Aaron Finch with 7 ducks has the highest number of such knocks for Australia.

Bowling records

Most career wickets 
A bowler takes the wicket of a batsman when the form of dismissal is bowled, caught, leg before wicket, stumped or hit wicket. If the batsman is dismissed by run out, obstructing the field, handling the ball, hitting the ball twice or timed out the bowler does not receive credit.

Bangladesh's Shakib Al Hasan is the highest wicket-taker in T20Is. Adam Zampa is the highest ranked Aussie bowler on the all-time.

Best figures in an innings 
Bowling figures refers to the number of the wickets a bowler has taken and the number of runs conceded.
India's Deepak Chahar holds the world record for best figures in an innings when he took 6/7 against Bangladesh in November 2019 at Nagpur. Ashton Agar holds the Australian record for best bowling figures.

Best figures in an innings – progression of record

Best bowling figures against each opponent 
{| class="wikitable sortable" 
|- 
! Opposition !! Player !! Figures !! Date
|-
||  || rowspan=2|Adam Zampa || 2/22 || 
|-
||  ||5/19 || 
|-
||  || Shane Watson ||4/15 || 
|-
||  || Jason Behrendorff ||4/21 || 
|-
||  || Shane Watson ||3/26 ||  
|-
||  || Ashton Agar ||6/30 || 
|-
||  || James Faulkner ||5/27 ||  
|-
||  || Ashton Agar ||5/24 || 
|-
||  || Josh Hazlewood ||4/12 ||  
|-
|rowspan=2| || Nathan Coulter-Nile ||rowspan=2|2/20 || rowspan=2|
|-
|| Billy Stanlake
|-
||  || Mitchell Starc || 4/20 || 
|-
||  || Andrew Tye ||3/12 || 
|-
|- class=sortbottom
| colspan=5 | <small>Last updated: 4 November 2022.</small>
|}

 Best career average 
A bowler's bowling average is the total number of runs they have conceded divided by the number of wickets they have taken.
Afghanistan's Rashid Khan holds the record for the best career average in T20Is with 12.62. Ajantha Mendis, Sri Lankan cricketer, is second behind Rashid with an overall career average of 14.42 runs per wicket. Josh Hazlewood with an average of 18.02 is the highest ranked Australian bowler.

 Best career economy rate 
A bowler's economy rate is the total number of runs they have conceded divided by the number of overs they have bowled.
New Zealand's Daniel Vettori, holds the T20I record for the best career economy rate with 5.70. Adam Zampa, with a rate of 6.51 runs per over conceded over his 37-match T20I career, is the highest Australian on the list.

 Best career strike rate 
A bowler's strike rate is the total number of balls they have bowled divided by the number of wickets they have taken.
The top bowler with the best T20I career strike rate is Rashid Khan of Afghanistan with strike rate of 12.3 balls per wicket. James Faulkner is the Aussie bowler with the lowest strike rate.

 Most four-wickets (& over) hauls in an innings 
Pakistan's Umar Gul has taken the most four-wickets (or over) among all the bowlers. 11 Aussies bowlers have taken at-least one such haul.

 Best economy rates in an inning 
The best economy rate in an inning, when a minimum of 12 balls are delivered by the bowler, is Sri Lankan player Nuwan Kulasekara economy of 0.00 during his spell of 0 runs for 1 wicket in 2 overs against Netherlands at Zohur Ahmed Chowdhury Stadium in the 2014 ICC World Twenty20. David Hussey holds the Australian record during his spell in India's tour of Australia in 2012 at Sydney, Australia and by Billy Stanlake against Pakistan during the 2018 Zimbabwe Tri-Nation Series.

 Best strike rates in an inning 
The best strike rate in an inning, when a minimum of 4 wickets are taken by the player, is by Steve Tikolo of Kenya during his spell of 4/2 in 1.2 overs against Scotland during the 2013 ICC World Twenty20 Qualifier at ICC Academy, Dubai, UAE. Both Faulkner and Agar during their spells when they took five-wickets in an inning also recorded the best strike rate for an Aussie bowler.

 Worst figures in an innings 
The worst figures in a T20I came in the Sri Lanka's tour of Australia when Kasun Rajitha of Sri Lanka had figures of 0/75 off his four overs at Adelaide Oval, Adelaide. The worst figures by an Australian is 0/59 that came off the bowling of Kane Richardson in the 2018 tour of England at Edgbaston Cricket Ground, Birmingham, England.

 Most runs conceded in a match 
Kasun Rajitha also holds the dubious distinction of most runs conceded in a T20I during the aforementioned match. Andrew Tye with figures of 2/64 off his four overs against New Zealand in February 2018 holds the most runs conceded distinction for Australia.

 Most wickets in a calendar year 
Australia's Andrew Tye holds the record for most wickets taken in a year when he took 31 wickets in 2018 in 19 T20Is.

 Most wickets in a series 
2019 ICC World Twenty20 Qualifier at UAE saw records set for the most wickets taken by a bowler in a T20I series when Oman's pacer Bilal Khan tool 18 wickets during the series. Dirk Nannes in the 2010 ICC World Twenty20 took 14 wickets, the most for an Aussie bowler in a series.

 Hat-trick 
In cricket, a hat-trick occurs when a bowler takes three wickets with consecutive deliveries. The deliveries may be interrupted by an over bowled by another bowler from the other end of the pitch or the other team's innings, but must be three consecutive deliveries by the individual bowler in the same match. Only wickets attributed to the bowler count towards a hat-trick; run outs do not count.
In T20Is history there have been just 13 hat-tricks, the first achieved by Brett Lee for Australia against Bangladesh in 2007 ICC World Twenty20.

Wicket-keeping records
The wicket-keeper is a specialist fielder who stands behind the stumps being guarded by the batsman on strike and is the only member of the fielding side allowed to wear gloves and leg pads.

 Most career dismissals 
A wicket-keeper can be credited with the dismissal of a batsman in two ways, caught or stumped. A fair catch is taken when the ball is caught fully within the field of play without it bouncing after the ball has touched the striker's bat or glove holding the bat, Laws 5.6.2.2 and 5.6.2.3 state that the hand or the glove holding the bat shall be regarded as the ball striking or touching the bat while a stumping occurs when the wicket-keeper puts down the wicket while the batsman is out of his ground and not attempting a run.
Brad Haddin and Alex Carey is the highest ranked Aussie wicket keeper in the all-time list of taking most dismissals in T20Is as a designated wicket-keeper, which is headed by India's MS Dhoni and West Indian Denesh Ramdin.

 Most career catches 
Haddin and Adam Gilchrist have taken the most catches in T20Is as a designated wicket-keeper with Dhoni and Ramdin leading the all-time list.

 Most career stumpings 
Carey has made the most stumpings in T20Is as a designated wicket-keeper among Aussies with Dhoni and Kamran Akmal of Pakistan heading this all-time list.

 Most dismissals in an innings 
Four wicket-keepers on four occasions have taken five dismissals in a single innings in a T20I.

The feat of taking 4 dismissals in an innings has been achieved by 19 wicket-keepers on 26 occasions with Gilchrist being the only Australian wicket-keeper.

 Most dismissals in a series 
Netherlands wicket-keeper Scott Edwards holds the T20Is record for the most dismissals taken by a wicket-keeper in a series. He made 13 dismissals during the 2019 ICC World Twenty20 Qualifier. Australian record is held by Gilchrist when he made 9 dismissals during the 2007 ICC World Twenty20.

Fielding records

 Most career catches 
Caught is one of the nine methods a batsman can be dismissed in cricket. The majority of catches are caught in the slips, located behind the batsman, next to the wicket-keeper, on the off side of the field. Most slip fielders are top order batsmen.

South Africa's David Miller holds the record for the most catches in T20Is by a non-wicket-keeper with 69, followed by New Zealand's Martin Guptill on 62 and Shoaib Malik of Pakistan with 50. David Warner is the leading catcher for Australia.

 Most catches in an innings 
The feat of taking 4 catches in an innings has been achieved by 14 fielders on 14 occasions. No Australian fielder has achieved this feat. The most is three catches on nine occasions.

 Most catches in a series 
The 2019 ICC Men's T20 World Cup Qualifier, which saw Netherlands retain their title, saw the record set for the most catches taken by a non-wicket-keeper in a T20I series. Jersey's Ben Stevens and Namibia's JJ Smit took 10 catches in the series. David Warner and Michael Hussey with 8 catches in the 2010 ICC World Twenty20 are the leading Aussie fielder on this list.

Other records
 Most career matches 
Pakistan's Shoaib Malik holds the record for the most T20I matches played with 122, followed by his teammate Mohammad Hafeez with 119 and Rohit Sharma of India with 116 games. David Warner is the most experienced Aussie player having represented the team on 87 occasions.

 Most consecutive career matches 
Scotland's Richie Berrington hold the record for the most consecutive T20I matches played with 70. David Warner holds the Aussie record.

 Most matches as captain 
MS Dhoni, who led the Indian cricket team from 2007 to 2016, holds the record for the most matches played as captain in T20Is with 72. Aaron Finch has led Australia in most matches for any player from his country.

 Most matches won as a captain 

 Youngest players on Debut 
The youngest player to play in a T20I match is Marian Gherasim at the age of 14 years and 16 days. Making his debut for Romania against the Bulgaria on 16 October 2020 in the first T20I of the 2020 Balkan Cup thus becoming the youngest to play in a men's T20I match.

 Oldest Players on Debut 
The Turkish batsmen Osman Göker is the oldest player to make their debut a T20I match. Playing in the 2019 Continental Cup against Romania at Moara Vlasiei Cricket Ground, Moara Vlăsiei he was aged 59 years and 181 days.

 Oldest Players 
The Turkish batsmen Osman Göker is the oldest player to appear in a T20I match during the same above mentioned match.

Partnership records
In cricket, two batsmen are always present at the crease batting together in a partnership. This partnership will continue until one of them is dismissed, retires or the innings comes to a close.

Highest partnerships by wicket
A wicket partnership describes the number of runs scored before each wicket falls. The first wicket partnership is between the opening batsmen and continues until the first wicket falls. The second wicket partnership then commences between the not out batsman and the number three batsman. This partnership continues until the second wicket falls. The third wicket partnership then commences between the not out batsman and the new batsman. This continues down to the tenth wicket partnership. When the tenth wicket has fallen, there is no batsman left to partner so the innings is closed.

Highest partnerships by runs
The highest T20I partnership by runs for any wicket is held by the Afghan pairing of Hazratullah Zazai and Usman Ghani who put together an opening wicket partnership of 236 runs during the Ireland v Afghanistan series in India in 2019

Highest overall partnership runs by a pair

Umpiring records
Most matches umpired
An umpire in cricket is a person who officiates the match according to the Laws of Cricket''. Two umpires adjudicate the match on the field, whilst a third umpire has access to video replays, and a fourth umpire looks after the match balls and other duties. The records below are only for on-field umpires.

Ahsan Raza of Pakistan holds the record for the most T20I matches umpired with 49. The most experienced Australian umpire is Rod Tucker with 35 matches officiated so far.

See also

List of Twenty20 International cricket records
List of Twenty20 International cricket hat-tricks
List of Test cricket records
List of One Day International cricket records

Notes

References 

Twenty20 International records
Australia
Australian cricket lists